Idu Saadhya ( This is possible) is a 1989 Indian Kannada-language film directed by Dinesh Babu. It is heavily inspired by the 1987 Italian slasher film Stage Fright (original title : Deliria) directed by Michele Soavi. Idu Saadhya created a world record by becoming the first film to be shot within a span of 36 hours. It also marked Revathi's Kannada debut.

Cast
 Anant Nag as Kyatha/Karthik Kamplapur
 Shankar Nag as Director of Drama
 Srinath as Ganesh
 Prabhakar as Muniyappa
 Devaraj as Ravi
 Ramesh Arvind as Dr. Prathap
 Mahalakshmi as Kavitha
Revathi as Indu
 Kavya (of Inspector Vikram fame) as Asha
 Srividya as hospital patient
 Disco Shanti as Chithra
 Anjali Sudhakar as nurse
 Mukhyamantri Chandru as police constable
 Bheeman Raghu as psycho killer "Goobe"

Music
"Joke Nee" - Alisha Chinai, B. R. Chaya
"Kanni Nalle" - Alisha Chinai, K. S. Chithra

Awards
Cinema Express Award for Best Director - Dinesh Babu

References

External links

1980s Kannada-language films
Indian horror films
Indian serial killer films
Indian remakes of Italian films
Films directed by Dinesh Baboo
1989 horror films
1989 films
1980s serial killer films
Films scored by Vijayanand